Rustfontein Dam is a gravity type dam located on the Modder River near Thaba 'Nchu, Free State, South Africa. It was established in 1955 and serves mainly for domestic supply and industrial purposes. Its hazard potential has been ranked high (3).

See also
List of reservoirs and dams in South Africa
List of rivers of South Africa

References 

 List of South African Dams from the Department of Water Affairs and Forestry (South Africa)

Dams in South Africa
Dams completed in 1955
1955 establishments in South Africa